Sahara Press Service (SPS) is the multi-lingual official press agency of the Sahrawi Arab Democratic Republic, the government in exile of the Western Sahara. The agency mainly report government-related news and current Sahrawi affairs, both from the liberated territories, the occupied territories and the Sahrawi refugee camps in Tindouf, Algeria.

History 
The Polisario Front recognised the importance of press at an early stage. They took journalists to occupied territories and established the Sahara Press Service at the Sahrawi refugee camps on 29 March 1999 (A POLISARIO agency press had been founded previously in 1980). The Sahara Press Service Dispatches began to be posted on the internet since April 1999, due to the combined efforts of the Friends of Sahrawi People in Switzerland and Spain. Among the founders of SPS was the journalist and then SADR Minister of Information Mohamed Fadel Ismail Ould Es-Sweyih. Its current director and editor in chief is Saleh Nafee. The Sahara Press Service also releases the El Karama monthly magazine which reports on human rights violations in the region.

Reports were published only in French until 2001, when the SPS website was opened. In March 2001, news started to be published also in Spanish. On April 20, 2003, the news were also published in English on the website. In 2005, SPS added Arabic to the language options of their site. In September 2010, SPS started releasing a weekly news resume bulletin in PDF format. On 1 July 2012 news started to be published in Russian as well.

On 25 January 2012, president of the SADR Mohamed Abdelaziz inaugurated the new headquarters of the press agency on the Sahrawi refugee camps.

See also
 RASD TV

External links
 SPS homepage

References

News agencies based in the Sahrawi Arab Democratic Republic
Organizations established in 1999
Multilingual news services
Arab news agencies
Arab mass media